Jeremy Cijntje (born 8 January 1998) is a professional footballer who plays for Norwegian club Jerv as a winger. Born in the Netherlands, he represented Curaçao at under-20 youth level.

Club career
In January 2021 he moved on loan to Waasland-Beveren.

On 31 August 2021, he moved on a new loan to Roda JC Kerkrade.

On 15 January 2022, Cijntje moved on loan to FC Den Bosch. In September 2022 he moved to Norwegian club Jerv.

International career
He represented the Curaçao national under-20 team in 2017 CONCACAF U-20 Championship qualifying, scoring against Saint Kitts and Nevis.

References

1998 births
Footballers from Dordrecht
Living people
Curaçao footballers
Curaçao under-20 international footballers
Dutch footballers
Association football forwards
FC Dordrecht players
Heracles Almelo players
S.K. Beveren players
Roda JC Kerkrade players
FC Den Bosch players
Eredivisie players
Eerste Divisie players
Belgian Pro League players
Curaçao expatriate footballers
Expatriate footballers in Belgium
Curaçao expatriate sportspeople in Belgium
FK Jerv players
Eliteserien players
Dutch expatriate footballers
Dutch expatriate sportspeople in Belgium
Dutch expatriate sportspeople in Norway
Curaçao expatriates in Norway